Mozhaiyur (also Mozaiyur, Mozhayur) is a village in Mayiladuthurai taluk in the Mayiladuthurai district of Tamil Nadu state, India.

The nearest railway station is at Mayiladuthurai.

References

Villages in Mayiladuthurai district